Plain of the Cul-de-Sac (also known as the Cul-de-Sac Plain, or the Cul-de-Sac Depression) is a fertile lowland on the island of Hispaniola. It extends from southeastern Haiti into the southwestern Dominican Republic, where it is known as the Hoya de Enriquillo.

Geography
Covering an area of 28 000 km2 around with a length of 32 km long and 25 km wide, the Plain of the Cul-de-Sac is bounded to the north and south by high mountains and to the west by the Gulf of Gonâve on edges of which is the Haitian capital of Port-au-Prince and to the Plaine de l'Arcahaie that extends to the west. The Plain of the Cul-de-Sac extends eastward into the Dominican Republic.

This valley was once an arm of the sea and upon withdrawal of the latter during the uprising Oligocene Miocene, salt water was trapped in the lowest points of depression resulting in two grand lakes; the Etang Saumâtre (also called "Lake Azuéi") in Haiti and Lake Enriquillo in the Dominican Republic and a small freshwater pond called Trou Caïman, also in Haiti.

The plain has always been a farming region. In the colonial era, indigo was cultivated there. Over the decades, this production lost its momentum, giving way to fields of sugar cane. The Rivière Blanche (Ouest), through its irrigation system and channeling of part of its journey to the Canal Boucanbrou, trickles down this vast plain. In its southern part, the Plain of Cul-de-Sac is crossed by the Rivière Grise.

References

External links
Plaine du Cul-de-Sac coordinates

Landforms of Haiti
Landforms of the Dominican Republic
Plains of North America